Club Sportiv Tunari, commonly known as CS Tunari, or simply as Tunari, is a Romanian  football club based in Tunari, Ilfov County. Founded in 1992 the club situated near Bucharest was re-branded as CS Tunari in 2004, reaching the Liga III in 2009, where it plays since then.

History
CS Tunari was founded in 1980 under the name of Arsenal Tunari, the name change occurring in 2004, when they were forced to give up the "Arsenal" name because of copyright. In the same period in the commune near Bucharest was built a new stadium and Tunari obtained a place in the third tier in 2009, since then being a constant presence at this level, registering the following rankings: 9th (2009–10), 7th (2010–11), 10th (2011–12), 13th (2012–13), 8th (2013–14), 4th (2014–15), 12th (2015–16), 3rd (2016–17), 7th (2017–18), 6th (2018–19), 4th (2019-20), 5th (2020-21) and 2nd (2021-22).

Tunari means Gunners in Romanian and the commune has on its Coat of Arms a cannon, fact that brought the original name, a tribute to English football club Arsenal F.C. and the nickname "The Gunners". In 2018 the club changed its logo and colors choosing a white and red combination instead of red and blue, also adding on the logo the name "Arsenal", but without changing the club name. In 2009, in an interview granted to sport.ro, Lucian Costache, chairman of the club reported how in 1996, when the club was still named Arsenal Tunari, they sent a letter to the English club asking for some original kits, but no answer was ever received.

Ground
CS Tunari plays its home matches on the Comunal Stadium in Tunari, with a capacity of 1,000 seats. The stadium was renovated and expanded in 2004 for the sum of 400,000 lei, at that time approximately 84,000 €. In 2017 the stadium was renovated again and the pitch was changed.

Chronology of names

Honours
Liga III
Runners-up (1): 2021–22

Players

First team squad

Out on loan

Club officials

Board of directors

Current technical staff

League history

Notable former managers

  Florin Bratu
  Ion Ion
  Tudorel Stoica

References

External links
CS Tunari at soccerway.com
CS Tunari at liga2.prosport.ro

Association football clubs established in 1980
Football clubs in Ilfov County
Liga III clubs
Liga IV clubs
1980 establishments in Romania